Suriya Amatawech (born 28 January 1982) is a Thai former professional footballer who plays as a striker.

International career
Suriya played for Thailand at the 1999 FIFA U-17 World Championship in New Zealand.

References

External links
 

1980s births
Living people
Suriya Amatawech
Suriya Amatawech
Association football forwards
Suriya Amatawech
Suriya Amatawech
Suriya Amatawech
Suriya Amatawech
Suriya Amatawech
Suriya Amatawech
1982 births